The Radio Dept. is a Swedish dream pop band from Lund, Sweden.

History
In 1995, schoolmates Elin Almered and Johan Duncanson started a band which they named after a gas-station-turned-radio-repair-shop called "Radioavdelningen" (Swedish for The Radio Department). However, Almered and Duncanson soon stopped playing music together, putting the outfit on hiatus. Three years later, in 1998, Duncanson started making music again but now with Martin Larsson and they decided to adopt the same name. In 2001, Larsson's then girlfriend Lisa Carlberg joined the group on bass, followed by Per Blomgren on drums and Daniel Tjäder on keyboards.

Later in 2001, the Radio Dept. sent recordings to music magazine Sonic, receiving a positive review and being featured on the free CD sampler that came with the magazine. Labrador Records heard them on the disc and signed them to their label. The band's debut album Lesser Matters (2003) was well received by the music press, scoring 10 out of 10 in the NME. Per Blomgren left the Radio Dept. prior to the release of this album and Lisa Carlberg departed after the release of This Past Week EP. According to their website, the band decided to use digital drum tracks and stated that for their second album they were "taking a new direction ... which wouldn't require a member that played bass guitar." NME would rank Lesser Matters ninth on their list of the 50 best albums of 2004. The album received an 84/100 (Universal acclaim) on Metacritic from a total of five reviews.

The group enjoyed a slightly more widespread recognition after three tracks ("Pulling Our Weight", "I Don't Like It Like This" and "Keen on Boys") were included on the soundtrack for Sofia Coppola's film Marie Antoinette.

Early 2006 saw the release of their second album, Pet Grief. The distorted buzz that adorned most of their debut was now replaced by synthesizer.  The album didn't reach the rest of Europe, including the UK until later in 2006. With little touring support, there was no real buzz behind Pet Grief. Reviews were mixed. NME rated the album with a 7 out of 10, but other magazines were less positive. However, it did find popularity amongst a growing fan base throughout the world, thanks to the internet. The album is available in the US through Darla and through their US distribution deal with Labrador.

At the end of 2006, a new track, "We Made the Team", was released as the 100th release on the Labrador. It was also the final track on the Labrador's labels Compilation of 100 tracks released at the beginning of 2007.

The band released a new EP in May 2008 entitled Freddie And The Trojan Horse on Labrador Records. Another EP, David, was released on June 24, 2009. The song "David" was also made available for download at no cost by Labrador Records. The band released their third album, Clinging to a Scheme, on April 20, 2010.

In January 2011, their first compilation album, Passive Aggressive: Singles 2002–2010, was released. It contained all the A-sides released by the band and many of the B-sides and other rarities. That year they were nominated at the Swedish Grammis in the categories “Album of the Year” and “Band of the Year”. In 2011, the band began a tour in the United States and Mexico; in 2012 they visited Latin America, and in 2013 they toured in Turkey and other countries of Asia.

The group' fourth album, Running Out of Love, was released on October 21, 2016. Running Out of Love was shortlisted by IMPALA (The Independent Music Companies Association) for the Album of the Year Award 2016, an award for the best album released on an independent European label.
 
In August 2018, the band released the single "Going Down Swinging".

In 2019, Radio Dept. released the LP I Don't Need Love, I've Got My Band, which compiled songs from the EPs Pulling Our Weight and This Past Week. The album was released on their new label, Just So Records.

Musical style
The Radio Dept. are related to such genres as alternative rock, dream pop, indie pop, shoegaze and twee pop, with reviews comparing them to Pet Shop Boys, My Bloody Valentine and Cocteau Twins.

In an interview on their fansite, they cite influences such as Charles Aznavour, Saint Etienne, Broadcast, Frank Sinatra, Joy Division, Pet Shop Boys, Chet Baker, Fennesz, Nick Drake, Kevin Rowland, Prefab Sprout, Paddy McAloon, Junior Boys, Orange Juice, Kraftwerk, Neu!, Jonathan Richman, The Avalanches and The Pale Fountains.

Band members
Current members
Johan Duncanson
Martin Larsson, alias Martin Carlberg
Daniel Tjäder (touring member)
Past members
Elin Almered (1995)
Lisa Carlberg (2001-2005)
Per Blomgren (2001-2003)
Kim Sjölander
Max Weiland
Le Bombe
Rugar

Anuar Adame

Discography

Lesser Matters (2003)
Pet Grief (2006)
Clinging to a Scheme (2010)
Running Out of Love (2016)

References

Musical groups established in 1995
Dream pop musical groups
Shoegazing musical groups
Swedish indie pop groups
Swedish synthpop groups
English-language singers from Sweden
Darla Records artists